John Theriault (born 22 January 1960) is an Australian curler. He is originally from Zweibrücken, Germany. Theriault also curled in the Ottawa area before moving to Australia.

At the international level, he is a  curler.

As of 2012, he was a President of the Australian Curling Federation.

Personal life
As of the 2005 World Championships, Theriault was living in Sydney, was married and had four children and worked for Indigo Pacific.

Teams and events

References

External links

Living people
1960 births
Australian male curlers
Pacific-Asian curling champions

Place of birth missing (living people)
German emigrants to Australia
Sportspeople from Rhineland-Palatinate
People from Zweibrücken
Sportspeople from Sydney
Curlers from Ontario